The 2006 Leeward Islands Junior Championships in Athletics took place on July 1–2, 2006.  The event was held in St. John's, Antigua and Barbuda.  A detailed report was published.

A total of 50 events were contested, 25 by boys and 25 by girls.

Medal summary
Complete results can be found on the Nevis Amateur Athletic Association webpage.

Boys (U-20)

†: Open event for both U20 and U17 athletes.

Girls (U-20)

†: Open event for both U20 and U17 athletes.

Boys (U-17)

Girls (U-17)

Medal table (unofficial)

Team trophies
The scores for the team trophy were published.

Participation
According to an unofficial count, 138 athletes from 7 countries participated.

 (20)
 (26)
 (22)
 (1)
 (25)
 (32)
 (12)

References

2006
Leeward Islands Junior Championships in Athletics
Leeward Islands Junior Championships in Athletics
Sport in St. John's, Antigua and Barbuda
Athletics in Antigua and Barbuda
2006 in youth sport